Pihani is a town and nagar palika parishad (municipal board) in Hardoi district of Uttar Pradesh, India. Historically, the city was a centre of sword production, leading to at least one British writer calling it "the Damascus of Oudh". Today, important industries in Pihani include jaggery and woven carpets. As of 2011, the town's population is 36,014, in 5,626 households. Pihani also serves as the headquarters of a community development block in Shahabad tehsil.

Geography
It has an average elevation of 141 metres (462 feet).

Demographics

 India census, Pihani had a population of 27,535. Males constitute 52% of the population and females 48%. Pihani has an average literacy rate of 46%, lower than the national average of 59.5%: male literacy is 53%, and female literacy is 38%. In Pihani, 19% of the population is under 6 years of age.

Transport
Pihani is well connected with Hardoi City  . Government and private buses are available for Hardoi, Lucknow, Kanpur and Delhi.

History
There are two different accounts of the founding of Pihani. The first, traditionally told by Hindu locals, holds that Pihani was originally settled by Dube Brahmins from Kannauj. They had supposedly been invited by Raja Lakhan Sen, a Gaur king who had conquered the fort of Simaurgarh (near Mansurnagar) from the Thatheras. The Muslim account, on the other hand, says that Pihani was founded by Sayyid Abdul Ghafur, who served as qazi of Kannauj under the Mughal emperor Humayun. In 1540, after Humayun's defeat by Sher Shah Suri, Abdul Ghafur refused to acknowledge Sher Shah's rule and left Kannauj to take shelter in the jungle where Pihani now stands. The name "Pihani" is thus said to derive from the word pinhani, meaning "concealment".

One of the main historical monuments in Pihani is the ornate tomb of Nawab Sadr Jahan, who served as a minister under Akbar. It consists of a double dome supported by red sandstone pillars, while the surrounding area is shaded by large tamarind trees. An inscription in Persian says that the tomb's construction began in 1071 AH and finished 10 years later. Sadr Jahan's son, Badr-i-Alam, is also buried here. Another monument is the ruined fort of Nizam Murtaza Khan (Badr-i-Alam's son); its western gate is still extant, as are the high walls built of kankar blocks.

Under the Nawabs of Awadh, Pihani was renowned for the quality of its sword blades. It also produced woven turbans (aka dastars), but both of these industries had declined by the turn of the 20th century.

At the turn of the 20th century, Pihani was described as having two distinct quarters named Bari Pihani and Chhoti Pihani. Bari Pihani was older and more run-down at the time, while Chhoti Pihani, or Nizampur, had been founded by Nizam Murtaza Khan and was more prosperous, with many trees providing shade. Pihani remained a minor commercial centre, with a police station, post office, cattle pound, and several schools: one middle school, a lower primary school for boys, and two lower primary schools for girls.

Economy
As of 1971, the economy of Pihani was described as dominated by primary activities. The main items imported were cloth, groceries, and kerosene oil. The main items manufactured were handloom, shoes, and agricultural implements. The biggest exports were cane sugar, paddy, and wheat.

Villages
Pihani CD block has the following 123 villages:

References

External links
 pihaninpp.in (Official website of Pihani)

Cities and towns in Hardoi district